Drymoanthus minutus, commonly known as the green midget orchid, is a species of epiphytic or lithophytic orchid that forms small clumps with many thick roots emerging from a thin, erect stem. Between two and five dark green, leathery leaves are arranged along the stem and up to seven minute green to yellowish, star-shaped flowers are arranged on a stiff flowering stem. The sepals and petals are similar to each other and there is a fleshy white, unlobed labellum. This orchid occurs in northern Queensland where it grows in rainforest, usually at higher altitudes.

Description 
Flowering occurs from December to February.

Taxonomy and naming
Drymoanthus minutus was first formally described in 1943 by William Henry Nicholls and the description was published in The Victorian Naturalist. The specific epithet (minutus) is a Latin word meaning "little" or "small", referring to "the diminutive character of the plant".

Distribution and habitat
The green midget orchid grows on trees and rocks in rainforest near streams, often on twigs of bottlebrush shrubs.

References

Aeridinae
Orchids of Queensland
Endemic orchids of Australia
Plants described in 1943
Epiphytes